Cambridge Christian School is a private preschool and K–12 Christian school in Cambridge, Minnesota.

References

External links
 

Christian schools in Minnesota
Private elementary schools in Minnesota
Private high schools in Minnesota
Private middle schools in Minnesota
Schools in Isanti County, Minnesota
Cambridge, Minnesota